Oliver McCall vs. Frank Bruno, billed as "The Empire Strikes Back", was a professional boxing match contested on 2 September 1995 for the WBC Heavyweight Championship.

Background
McCall first wrested the WBC championship by knocking out Lennox Lewis on 24 September 1994 in London. Since then he had made one defence of his title, a hotly contested and closely fought decision against former world heavyweight champion Larry Holmes on 8 April 1995.

This was Bruno's fourth attempt at winning a world title. WBA Champion Tim Witherspoon knocked him out in 11 rounds in 1986, undisputed champion Mike Tyson stopped him in five rounds in 1989, and WBC champion Lennox Lewis finished his fellow Brit in seven rounds in 1993.

The winner of the bout was contractually obligated to defend his belt against the returning Tyson in his next fight.

The fight
In the opening rounds, Bruno unloaded a barrage of left jabs and a right hand that knocked Mccall onto the ropes and left  him stunned. However, McCall absorbed the punishment, put up little defense and waited until the fifth round to throw a meaningful punch. But by then, Bruno was boxing well and ahead on points.

As the fight wore on, it became apparent that McCall's hope was to retain the title by winning by stoppage or knockout in the hope Bruno would tire. 

McCall hurt Bruno with an uppercut in the 11th, and in the 12th, McCall shoved the local hero around the ring and unloaded a hard right to Bruno's head. McCall banged Bruno with another body shot and a left-right combination. Bruno, bleeding from the mouth, hanging on and desperately tired, used his ring experience to survive the onslaught. 

Judge Malcolm Bulner gave Bruno a 115-113 victory. Newton Campos and Fay Solis each had Bruno the winner by 117-111. Bruno became only the third British-born boxer to win a world heavyweight title along with Bob Fitzsimmons and Lennox Lewis—and he was the first to win it on British soil.

Aftermath
Bruno's reign as champion was short lived as he lost his first defence against Mike Tyson and retired shortly afterwards.

McCall returned to the ring 6 months later when he beat future WBC heavyweight champion Oleg Maskaev. In 1997 he fought a rematch again Lennox Lewis for the now vacant WBC title, which he lost in bizarre fashion as he refused to fight and started crying.

Undercard
Confirmed bouts:

Broadcasting

References

1995 in boxing
World Boxing Council heavyweight championship matches
Boxing in England
1995 in British sport
September 1995 sports events in the United Kingdom
Boxing matches